Gurazala revenue division is an administrative division in the Palnadu district of the Indian state of Andhra Pradesh. It is one of the three revenue divisions in the district, along with Sattenapalli and  Narasaraopet formed in 2013 with nine mandals. On 4 April 2022, it has been restructured to contain ten mandals. Gurazala serves as the headquarters of the division.

Mandals 

The mandals in the revenue division are:

See also 
List of revenue divisions in Andhra Pradesh

References 

Revenue divisions in Guntur district